Hunter Township may refer to the following townships in the United States:

 Hunter Township, Edgar County, Illinois
 Hunter Township, Jackson County, Minnesota